The men's marathon at the 2013 World Championships in Athletics was held at the Luzhniki Stadium and Moscow streets on 17 August.

Coming through the half marathon in 1:05:10, the lead pack stayed formed until around the 30K mark with still about 13 with that group.  Over the next 5K, contenders began to fall off the pace, first a pack of six were left, with two Ugandans; reigning Olympic champion Stephen Kiprotich and Jackson Kiprop, with three Ethiopians; Lelisa Desisa, Tadese Tola and Tsegaye Kebede and Peter Kimeli Some the lone Kenyan.  Kiprop fell back but Kentaro Nakamoto fought his way back to the pack as Kiprotich began experimenting with surges.  Some and then Nakamoto started to fall behind.  Kebede was next to go, followed by Tola, but Desisa stuck to Kiprotich like glue.  Kiprotich crossed the roadway from side to side, more like match race sailboat tacking maneuvers and Delisa followed.  Finally in the last kilometer, Kiprotich was able to make a gap.  A meter became ten then fifty.  A jubilant Kiprotich began throwing kisses to the crowd, crossing the finish line more than a hundred meters ahead of Delisa.  Tola held on for third, with Kebede barely ahead of Nakamoto.  Solonei da Silva and Paulo Roberto Paula came in together, so with four Ethiopians, two Ugandans and two Brazilians, three countries put at least a pair of runners into the top ten, while Kenya only managed one; Some in ninth.

The original 33rd placer, Jeremías Saloj of Guatemala, was disqualified after testing positive for erythropoietin (EPO).

Records
Prior to the competition, the records were as follows:

Qualification standards

Schedule

Results

Final
The race was started at 13:30.

References

External links
Marathon results at IAAF website

marathon
Marathons at the World Athletics Championships
World Championships Men
Marathons in Russia
Men's marathons